GLJ may refer to:

 Gene Loves Jezebel
 German Law Journal
 Grupo León Jimenes
 Gula Iro language